Sundar Kumarasamy  joined Northeastern University as the Vice President of Enrollment Management in June 2015; he is responsible for undergraduate admissions and enrollment marketing, student financial services, and enrollment research, and also plays a role in student retention efforts.

Prior to his appointment by Northeastern, he served as Vice President for Enrollment Management and Marketing at the University of Dayton. Upon his arrival in 2007, he launched a strategic rebranding campaign, creating marketing materials with a distinct and cohesive look, feel and message that focused on the University of Dayton’s position as a national, top-10 Catholic university. Under his leadership, the University reached a record number of applicants from outside of their primary market and enrolled the largest and most academically talented classes in its history.  He is a graduate of Philadelphia University and holds a Master of Science in Instructional Technology. Prior to his arrival at the University of Dayton, he spent more than 10 years at Saint Joseph's University in Philadelphia as Assistant Provost and Assistant Vice President for Enrollment Management; Director of Enrollment Operations and Interim Director of Financial Aid.

In addition to being featured in a Forbes article, Sundar, in collaboration with 160over90 agency, was also featured by Adobe, discussing the development of the first fully interactive university viewbook iPad application. The Chronicle of Higher Education has written a feature article  documenting his unique and sometimes controversial approach to higher education marketing, including a guaranteed tuition plan that eliminates fees.

Sundar Kumarasamy has been interviewed by the New York Times, Wall Street Journal, USA Today, Business Week, Washington Post, Bloomberg Radio, Chicago Tribune and U.S. News & World Report  about higher education trends and marketing.

References

University of Dayton people
Living people
Year of birth missing (living people)